Anshan is an inland prefecture-level city in central-southeast Liaoning province, People's Republic of China, about  south of the provincial capital Shenyang. As of the 2020 census, it was Liaoning's third most populous city with a population of 3,325,372 people, over an area of about  spanning  from east to the west. Its built-up area encompassing the 4 Anshan urban districts (1,543,696 inhabitants), the 4 out of 5 urban Liaoyang districts (796,962 inhabitants, Gongchangling not being conurbated yet) and Liaoyang county largely being conurbated, was home to 2,712,789 million inhabitants in 2020.

The city's name came from the horse saddle-like shape of a nearby mountain south of the city, which can be seen on the left (west) about five minutes before the northbound train arrives at Anshan railway station.  Anshan is home to the Anshan Iron and Steel Group, one of the largest steel producers in China.  Anshan is sister city with Sheffield, United Kingdom.

Anshan holds one-third of the world's supply of talcum and a quarter of the world's reserves of magnesite.  Anshan also produced the largest ever jade stone, now a local tourist attraction carved as a Buddha statue.

History

The area of Anshan has been inhabited since prehistoric times.  The area remained of little significance, a small city in Liaodong province, overshadowed by neighbouring Liaoyang city, until the mid 20th Century.  In 1587 Anshan was fortified by the Ming Dynasty to combat the growing power of the Manchu.  The city was burnt down during the Boxer Rebellion, and was destroyed again in the Russo-Japanese War (1904–1905). As a result of this war, Japan had gained influence in Liaoning and was engaged in industrialising the region. Anshan lay beside the new South Manchuria Railway line that ran from the port of Dalian to the major city of Shenyang. As a joint Sino-Japanese venture, Anshan Zhenzing Iron Ore Company Unlimited was started in Anshan in 1918. After the Mukden Incident in 1931, Japan occupied the northeast of China. The mills were turned into a Japanese owned monopoly. In 1933, the site was expanded to include steel production and the company was renamed Showa Steel Works. Anshan became part of the Japanese puppet state of Manchukuo. Additional industries developed around the iron and steel mills. Anshan grew significantly in size around this new industrial site, becoming one of, if not the largest producer of iron and steel in Asia. It was therefore of strategic importance in the Pacific War, and was subject to several attacks by B-29 Superfortress strategic bombers of the USAAF. The Japanese Army detached the 1st Chutai (unit) of 104th Sentai (squadron) of the Imperial Japanese Army Air Force, to Anshan, with other air squadrons for industrial defense purposes. Although this unit was equipped with modern Nakajima Ki-84 Ia (Manshu Type) Hayate "Frank" fighters, manufactured by Manshūkoku Hikōki Seizo KK, the plant suffered heavy damage from the air raids, losing up to 30% of its capacity.

After the war in Europe ended, the Soviet Union declared war on Japan, as the Red Army simultaneously launched Operation August Storm. Soviet forces advanced rapidly and soon captured much of Manchuria from the Japanese. As they did throughout both Europe and Asia, the Soviets looted the areas they overran for anything of value, especially industrial infrastructure. The ruins of Shōwa Steel Works were ransacked for anything that could be taken back to the Soviet Union. With the defeat of Japan in 1945, Anshan was returned to China along with the rest of Chinese Manchuria. However, peace had not yet arrived. Civil war continued between the Chinese Nationalist Government and the Communist People's Liberation Army (PLA). The city of Anshan was the scene of one of the battles of this war. The city was taken by the PLA on February 19, 1948. A monument in Lieshishan park commemorates the battle.

The northeast of China was marked out to become a major industrial centre for the new People's Republic of China. Anshan was set to become a key part of this industrial development. The steel mills had been damaged during the wars. During this period, Anshan was given the same statues as provinces, although it was reversed after the period ended. In December 1948, the Anshan Iron and Steel Company—also known as Angang—was founded. Production in the newly repaired steel plant resumed on July 9, 1949. The plant was expanded to become the largest steel producer in China. Other industries setup alongside the steel plant including mining for coal, iron and other minerals. This industrial wealth had an environmental cost. The open-hearth furnaces of the steel mill created large amounts of dust and other pollution. Along with its growing reputation as a major steel producer, Anshan was also gaining a reputation as a dirty town.

Anshan became a formal administrative region under the Northeastern People's Government (later renamed as the Northeastern Administration Commission) in November, 1949.

Anshan is reported to have served as a base for Soviet MIG fighter aircraft and pilots during the Korean War (1950–1953) in air combat operations against US/UN forces.

On March 12, 1953, the city became a municipality under the Central Government direct administration. Haicheng County and Xiuyan County were subordinated to Liaodong Province. Tai'an County was subordinated to Liaoxi Province. August 22, 1954, the central government decided that Anshan should be administered by Liaoning Province. The State Council confirmed that Anshan should be in charge of Xiuyan County and Haicheng city in 1985.

The furnaces of the steel plant were changed in the 1980s to designs which blow oxygen in from the front. This increased the production and also reduced the pollution. In the 1990s, they were additionally altered to blow oxygen in from the top as well. This further increase production and reduced pollution. In December 2000, all three production lines of Anshan Iron and Steel company switched from mould-casting to continuous casting. This new technology has significantly reduced the dust and other pollution in the city. The new plant equipment is also much less labour-intensive. This has meant a reduction in the workforce has caused an unemployment problem in the city. A new drive to market Anshan as a tourist destination is hoped to help bolster the cities economy.

Geography
Sited north of the Liao River plains, Anshan has wide flat lands in the west and central regions that develop into hilly and mountainous terrain on the southeastern fringes, which is bounded by the Qian Mountains and contains the famous Qianshan National Park. The region is rich in minerals including iron ore, coal, magnesite, talcum and jade. One such agricultural product that Anshan has become renowned for is the Nanguo pears (Pyrus ussuriensis c.v. Nanguo), nicknamed the "king of pears". Anshan was used as a travel post with motels during Ming Dynasty for travellers who pass by on work duty.

Climate
Anshan has a monsoon-influenced humid continental climate (Köppen Dwa) characterised by hot, humid summers, due to the monsoon, and rather long, cold, and very dry winters, due to the Siberian anticyclone. The four seasons here are distinctive. Nearly half of the annual rainfall occurs in July and August. Sunshine is generous and amounts to 2,543 hours annually, while relative humidity averages 58%, ranging from 47% in March and April to 75% in July and August.

Administrative divisions 
Anshan is divided into four districts, one town, one county and one autonomous county.

Economy

The north east of China is a major industrial zone and Anshan is one of the key sites of the north east. The city is renowned as "China's capital of iron and steel". Prior to the development of the Iron and Steel industries, Anshan was a relatively small city of little importance. As the steel mills expanded, so to did the city. Spin off industries developed alongside the steel plant making the area a centre of heavy industry.

As a joint Sino-Japanese venture, Anshan Zhenzing Iron Ore Company Unlimited was started in Anshan in 1918. When Japan occupied Northeast China in 1931, these mills were turned into a Japanese owned monopoly. Anshan subsequently became part of the Japanese puppet state of Manchukuo and additional industries developed around the iron and steel mills. Due to its mills, the city became a significant strategic industrial hub during World War II and as such, was subject to constant Allied bombing during the war.

Total production of processed iron in Manchuria reached 1,000,000 tonnes in 1931–32, of which almost half was made by Shōwa Steel in Anshan. Iron production grew to 7,000,000 tonnes in 1938 and by 1941, Shōwa Steel Works had a total capacity production of 1,750,000 tonnes of iron bars and 1,000,000 tonnes of processed steel. By 1942, Anshan's Shōwa Steel Works total production capacity reached 3,600,000 tonnes, making it one of the major iron and steel centers in the world.

In 1945 the steel plant was looted by Soviet forces. The Republic of China government partially repaired the site, but it was destroyed again during the Chinese civil war that saw the Communist forces victorious. The mills were once again repaired and Anshan Iron and Steel Company (Angang) was founded in 1948. From then to 2001, the company produced 290 million tons of steel, 284 million tons of pig iron and 192 million tons of rolled steel. Until  the opening of a new steel plant in Shanghai, Angang was the largest steel producer in China. Today, Angang consists of three steelworks with 13 rolling mills plus supporting plants which produce coke, refractory materials and machinery for the steel plants. The company has an annual production capacity of 10 million tons of pig iron, 10 million tons of steel and 9.5 million tons of rolled steel. A quarter of China's total iron ore reserves, about 10 billion tons, are located in Anshan, ensuring that the city will remain an important steel producer well into the future.

Anshan is rich in other mineral wealth too. The southern and south eastern areas of Anshan are rich in magnesite, with reserves equivalent to a quarter of all worldwide reserves. Anshan also has the world's largest reserve of talcum, accounting for fully one third of the entire world supply. The Xiuyan area of Anshan is known for the production of jade. The largest single jade stone ever found came from Xiuyan, now carved into the form of a Buddha, it is a major tourist attraction in the area.

The government of Anshan established a five-year plan in 2000 with the aim of turning the city into a strong modern industrial city with plenty of tourism. It also aimed to make the city GDP reach 100 billion RMB by 2005 and to build a modern industrial city by using advances in technology to transform the traditional industries. Attracting foreign investment is also another main idea in the plan. The Anshan government anticipates the foreign investment assets would be around 80 billion RMB by 2005.

Anshan has been identified by the Economist Intelligence Unit in the November 2010 Access China White Paper as a member of the CHAMPS (Chongqing, Hefei, Anshan, Maanshan, Pingdingshan and Shenyang), an economic profile of the top 20 emerging cities in China. The opportunities for engaging Anshan's consumers have been documented by the ethnographer and cultural sociologist Michael B. Griffiths.

Demographics
Out of the 3,584,000 people living in Anshan prefecture, 519,400 are ethnic Manchu, a holdover from northeast China's historical rule by the ethnic group. They are mainly in or around the Xiuyan Man regional ethnic autonomy area which is within Anshan's borders. During the last years of the Qing dynasty, large numbers of Han people migrated to the north east in search of work. This pattern continued into the 20th century. The development of Anshan as a large industrial center during and after World War II caused the city's population to increase rapidly, and the new arrivals began to significantly outnumber the local Man people. As of the last census data, Anshan was home to 48 Chinese ethnic groups. The Han people make up the lion's share at 3,020,500 people. Next, after the Han and Man people, come the Hui and the Chaoxian with 23,400 and 10,000 people respectively. The Hui population is widely dispersed but the Chaoxian population is mostly concentrated in Teixi (West district) and Qianshan district.

Anshan has a population of 3.65 million at the 2010 census. As the city has expanded, the area between Anshan and the neighbouring city of Liaoyang has become urbanised, with little or no farmland visible on route between them. According to the 2010 census, the conurbation of urban Anshan and urban Liaoyang districts contains 2.17 million inhabitants.

The city of Anshan can be divided into districts. The East district, Tiedong has a population of 452,900. The western district, Tiexi has 311,600 people. These two districts are demarcated by the railway lines that run north to south through the city. The north western portion of the city is dominated by the large steel works of Angang. The district of Lishan houses 425,600 people and the suburbs of Qianshan district have 366,200 soles. Within Anshan prefecture lies the subordinate city of Haicheng which accounts for 1,181,100 people. The neighbouring subordinate town of Tai'an has 354,700 people.

Transportation

Anshan has no river or sea port. The nearby military airport, Anshan Teng'ao Airport (AOG), also accepts commercial domestic flights. Currently there are five routes in operation, Anshan–Beijing, Shanghai, Guangzhou, Chengdu and Nanjing, with one flight each per day throughout the year. In addition to the small terminal building at the airport, there is also a city terminal situated just off Qianshan Road in Tiexi district. Passengers may buy tickets and check-in at the city terminal, from which they are taken by coach to the main airport terminal.

The city is beside the Shenyang–Dalian Expressway (part of the G15 Shenyang–Haikou Expressway), a privately funded eight-lane tolled highway, and was the first road of its kind in mainland China. The Liaozhong Ring Expressway (G91) passes just a few kilometers north of Anshan city. It connects east to Benxi and west onto the Jingshen Expressway (G1). The Panhai and Danxi Expressways (together forming the G16) pass through Anshan's counties of Haicheng and Xiuyan, connecting them to Yingkou and Panjin in the west and Dandong to the east.

Anshan is connected to the Chinese rail network with rail routes to Beijing, Dalian, and to the northeastern provinces of Jilin and Heilongjiang as well as to eastern Inner Mongolia, and even a direct, albeit slow, train to Hong Kong. As of December 2012, the new Harbin–Dalian High-Speed Railway serves Anshan West Railway Station and Haicheng West Railway Station. It connects south to Dalian and north east to Shenyang, Changchun and Harbin. This line was hailed as the world's first alpine high-speed rail line. In summer it runs at its full speed of 300 km/h but in winter speeds are restricted to 200 km/h. High-speed services also run via Anshan to Beijing. Tai'an county of Anshan is served by another high-speed rail line linking Shenyang to Beijing.

Long-distance coaches run to all the main cities of the province as well as to Beijing.

Local transportation is primarily by bus or taxi. Anshan used to have a single tram line—along Zhonghua Avenue, through the city centre and past Angang main gate—but this has been closed and the tracks removed. Due to the flat topography of the city centre, bicycles are popular. Almost all roads have a wide cycle lane on each side. Often this lane is further protected by a traffic island that separates the bikes from larger motor vehicles.

Tourist attractions
In recent years, Anshan has been trying to throw off its image as a heavy industrial town along with the dirt and pollution that goes with such industry. It has remodeled itself as a tourist destination.

Qianshan, literally 'Thousand Mountains', is an abbreviation of 'Thousand lotus flower mountains'. The peaks were said to resemble the petals of the lotus flower which had been dropped to earth by a goddess. It is one of few locations where both religions are found sharing the same site. Cars are not allowed within the park.

One of the mountains in the park is believed to resemble Maitreya Buddha. It is claimed to be the largest naturally occurring image of Maitreya in the world. Several temples have been built on the peaks of the overlooking hills. Near the Buddha is a bird park.

Another major tourist location is "219 Park". The name of the park commemorates the liberation of Anshan by the People's Liberation Army on February 19, 1948. The park contains the Dongshan (East Mountain) scenic area as well as numerous lakes.

Of particular note is the Jade Buddha Palace. This large Buddhist temple complex of 22,104 square metres, houses the world's largest statue of Buddha made of Jade (It is called jade in Chinese, but in English it is Serpentine). It is a single piece of jade stone measuring 6.88 metres in width, 4.10 metres front to back and 7.95 metres high. The jade stone weighs 260.76 tons. The front of the stone has been carved with an image of Sakyamuni (aka. Gautama) Buddha. On the back of the stone Guanyin (aka. Avalokitesvara) Buddha has been carved. The jade stone was found in 1960 in Xiuyan County. It was declared a treasure of the State and listed as a protected property by Chinese Premier Zhou Enlai. Anshan city government commissioned the carving which took a team of 120 sculptures 18 months to complete. The temple complex was opened on September 3, 1996. The building that houses the Jade Buddha statue is 33 metres tall, representing the 33 layers of heaven in Buddhism. It claims to be one of the tallest two-story buildings of traditional Chinese architectural style in China.

Anshan contains naturally hot spring water spas. There are four spas/hotels in Anshan. Visitors may shower and bathe in the spring water. At Tanggangzi Spa, once frequented by the Qing Emperors of China, visitors may have mud treatment where they are buried in hot volcanic sand, which has been infused with the spring water. The geothermal energy is also used to provide hot steam and water for winter heating throughout the area.

Education system 
The city contains two large universities:

 Anshan Normal University
 University of Science and Technology, Liaoning

Notable people 
Kei Tomiyama (1938–1995), Japanese actor, voice actor, and narrator, born in Anshan
Zhang Dejiang (b. 1946), retired politician, served as the Chairman of the Standing Committee of the National People's Congress of the 12th National People's Congress
Ann Hui (b. 1947), Hong Kong New Wave film director, born in Anshan. Hui's 2006 film The Postmodern Life of My Aunt was partly set and filmed in Anshan.
Guo Mingyi (b. 1958), philanthropist who began work at Anshan Iron and Steel Group
Chen Xiaoxu (1965–2007), actress noted for playing Lin Daiyu
Tang Xiao'ou (b. 1968), computer scientist and co-founder of SenseTime
Lei Jiayin (b. 1983), actor noted for playing Chen Junsheng in The First Half of My Life
Du Jing (b. 1984), female badminton player, former women's double champion
Zhang Xiaofei (b. 1986), actress noted for her performance in Hi, Mom
Chen Tao (b. 1986), footballer, most recently played as midfielder for Sichuan Longfor
Zhang Wenzhao (b. 1987), footballer, most recently played as a midfielder for Beijing Renhe
Li Jiahang (b. 1987), actor noted for playing Fu Erkang in New My Fair Princess.
Li Man (b. 1988), actress noted for her role in Zhang Yimou'sCurse of the Golden Flower.
Li Xiaoxia (b. 1988), female table tennis player, Grand Slam champion.
Guo Yue, table tennis player, 2007 women's world champion.
Ma Long (b. 1988), male table tennis player, former world-ranked number one.
Wang Yanlin (b. 1989), actor
Beiwen Zhang (b. 1990), Chinese-born American badminton player
Xu Mengtao (b. 1990), 2022 Olympic Champion aerial skier.
Xu Minghao (stage name The8; b. 1997), member of popular K-pop group Seventeen, born in Anshan

See also 
 List of twin towns and sister cities in China

References

External links 

  

 
Cities in Liaoning
Prefecture-level divisions of Liaoning